Major General Sir Humphry Thomas Tollemache, 6th Baronet,  (10 August 1897 – 30 March 1990) was a senior Royal Marines officer and a baronet.

Early life and career
Tollemache was the son of Sir Lyonel Tollemache, 4th Baronet and Hersilia Henrietta Diana Oliphant. He was educated at Eastbourne College. Commissioned into the Royal Marines in 1915, he served with the Grand Fleet from 1916 to 1918. Between 1929 and 1931 he was Adjutant of the Royal Marines Depot. From 1936 to 1939, he was brigade major.

Second World War and after
Tollemache spent much of the Second World War in the Admiralty. On 13 December 1941, he was promoted to acting lieutenant colonel. His various appointments included command of Royal Marine deployments in the Middle East and the Far East (1939–1945), Commander of 3 Mobile Naval Base Brigade (1943–1944) and Commander of the Small Operations Group (1944–1945). When Tollemache (then Colonel) was appointed to command SOG on its formation in June 1944, Lieutenant Colonel Herbert Hasler was appointed as second-in-command.

Following the war, Tollemache became Commander of the Royal Marines Depot (1946–1947) and Director of Pay and Records Office, Royal Marines (1947–1949). Between 1949 and his retirement in 1952, he was General Officer Commanding the Portsmouth Group, Royal Marines, having been promoted to major general on 24 November 1949. He was invested as a Commander of the Order of the British Empire in 1950 and as a Companion of the Order of the Bath in 1952.

Personal life
Tollemache married Nora Priscilla Taylor, the daughter of John Taylor, on 6 February 1926, and together they had two sons.

Following the death of his brother, Cecil, in 1969, he succeeded to the Tollemache baronetcy. He is buried at St Peter's Church, Petersham, a village historically associated with the Tollemache Earls of Dysart.

References

External links
Royal Marines Officers 1939−1945
Generals of World War II

1897 births
1990 deaths
Royal Marines generals
Commanders of the Order of the British Empire
Royal Marines personnel of World War II
Royal Marines personnel of World War I
Companions of the Order of the Bath
Baronets in the Baronetage of Great Britain
Burials at St Peter's, Petersham
People educated at Eastbourne College
Humphrey
Military personnel from Sussex
People from Eastbourne